The year 1984 in science and technology involved some significant events.

Astronomy and space exploration
 February 7 – Astronauts Bruce McCandless II and Robert L. Stewart make the first untethered space walk.
 The National Radio Astronomy Observatory in the United States converts the 36-foot radio telescope on Kitt Peak (originally built in 1967) to the ARO 12m Radio Telescope.

Biology
 First known case of Bovine spongiform encephalopathy, in England.
 The enzyme telomerase is discovered by Carol W. Greider and Elizabeth Blackburn in the ciliate Tetrahymena.
 Danish physiologist Steen Willadsen first successfully uses cells from early embryos  to clone a mammal (sheep) by nuclear transfer at the British Agricultural Research Council's Institute of Animal Physiology, Cambridge.

Chemistry and physics
 Peter Kramer and Dan Shechtman publish their discoveries of what will soon afterwards be named quasicrystals.
 Hiroshi Kobayashi and colleagues announce synthesis of tetrakis(3,5-bis(trifluoromethyl)phenyl)borate ("BARF").

Computer science
 January 24 – Apple Computer places the Macintosh personal computer on sale in the United States. It will be the first successful PC to use a graphical user interface.
 June 6 – The Tetris tile-matching video game, designed by Alexey Pajitnov, is launched in the Soviet Union.
The first edition of language documentation Common Lisp the Language (known as CLtL1) is published in the United States.

History of science
 Robert Gwyn Macfarlane publishes Alexander Fleming: The Man and the Myth.

Paleontology
 The fossil skeleton of the hominid "Turkana Boy" is discovered in Kenya.

Physiology and medicine
 February 3 – Dr. John Buster and the research team at Harbor-UCLA Medical Center announce history's first embryo transfer from one woman to another resulting in a live birth.
 April 22 – Dr. Robert Gallo and Margaret Heckler of United States Public Health Service announce the discovery of HTLV-III as the virus that causes AIDS.
 May 10 – Barbara H. Bowman and Oliver Smithies show that variations in haptoglobins are due to genetic polymorphisms.

Technology
 May 5 – Itaipu Dam in South America begins to generate hydroelectricity.
 July 21 – In Jackson, Michigan, a factory robot crushes a worker against a safety bar in apparently the first robot-related death in the United States.

Awards
 Nobel Prizes
 Physics – Carlo Rubbia, Simon van der Meer
 Chemistry – Robert Bruce Merrifield
 Medicine – Niels K. Jerne, Georges J. F. Köhler, César Milstein
 Turing Award – Niklaus Wirth

Births
 May 14 – Mark Zuckerberg, American computer programmer and entrepreneur, co-founder of social media platform Facebook
 December 2 – Maryna Viazovska, Ukrainian-born mathematician

Deaths
 January 8 – Eerik Kumari (b. 1912), Estonian ornithologist and academic 
 February 21 – Anna Baetjer (b. 1899), American toxicologist.
 April 8 – Pyotr Kapitsa (b. 1894), Russian physicist, Nobel Prize laureate.
 April 15 – Grete Hermann (b. 1901), German mathematician and philosopher
 May 13 – Stanislaw Ulam (b. 1909), Polish American mathematician.
 May 24 – Sir Stanley Hooker (b. 1907), English aeronautical engineer.
 August 6 – Abraham Lilienfeld (b. 1920), American epidemiologist.
 August 11 – George Streisinger (b. 1927), Hungarian American molecular biologist, the first person to clone a vertebrate.
 October 20 – Paul Dirac (b. 1902), English-born physicist.
 November 20 – Charles C. Conley (b. 1933), American mathematician working on dynamical systems.
 December 20 – Stanley Milgram (b. 1933), American social psychologist.

References

 
20th century in science
1980s in science